Servicios Postales del Perú (Serpost) is the national post office of Peru. It is dedicated to the service of correspondence, money orders, and the national and international parcel and delivery market, and fulfills the functions of the Universal Postal Service.

Serpost employs 563 postal workers, 1,744 other workers and has 158 offices in Peru.

References

External links
Official website.

Philately of Peru
Communications in Peru
Postal organizations